The following is a summary of the  Inner Ear albums.  Inner Ear is a Norwegian record label.

References

External links 
 

Discographies of Norwegian record labels